Jackson Tasso (born 12 July 1993) is a Ni-Vanuatu footballer who plays as a midfielder for Amicale F.C. and the Vanuatu national football team.

Career

International
Tasso made his senior international debut on 14 November 2018 in a 1-0 friendly defeat to New Caledonia.

Career statistics

International

References

External links

1993 births
Living people
Vanuatuan footballers
Vanuatu international footballers
Association football midfielders
Vanuatu under-20 international footballers